The Dorak affair was a scandal concerning a group of antiquities from the Yortan culture, the so-called "Dorak Treasure", which took place in the 1950s and 1960s in Turkey and centred on British archaeologist James Mellaart.

Events
According to Mellaart, he encountered a young lady called Anna Papastrati on a train from Istanbul to Izmir and noticed that she was wearing an unusual armband. She is meant to have told him that this armband was part of a collection of antiquities, which was in the possession of her family. He therefore went to the house of Papastrati, who according to him was a young Greek lady and spoke good English with a slight American accent. There she showed him numerous pieces which were stylistically associated with the Yortan culture. The Yortan culture was one of the cultures which neighboured ancient Troy. Mellaart stayed several days in the house at Izmir, making sketches and notes. Photography of the pieces was forbidden, according to Mellaart. Papastrati promised to photograph the pieces herself at the next opportunity and send the photos to him. The items were said to have been found in shallow graves near the city of Dorak, south of the Sea of Marmara, during the Greco-Turkish War. Mellaart reported that he had seen photographs of the graves in which the Dorak treasure had been found and that there was a description of the discovery in Modern Greek, which he had also seen. Mellaart said he left the house after a few days without correctly noting its location, although he noted a name and address (Anna Papastrati, 217 Kazim Direk Street, Izmir) on a piece of notepaper. No communication was received subsequently from Papastrati. Mellaart said that he did not make the discovery public at first because he was waiting for the photos and consent to publication. He said he had written to Izmir twice without receiving an answer. 

In mid-October 1958, a letter was received by the British Institute of Archaeology in Ankara, where Mellaart was deputy director. It read:
 
The letter was dated "18/10/1958" and the return to sender address was "Kazim Direk Caddesi no. 217, Karsiyaka – Izmir."

Mellaart then published his sketches and notes on the finds in The Illustrated London News. Discussing their significance in the article, Mellaart drew parallels with the Treasure of Ur.

Investigations by the Turkish authorities and by journalists revealed, however, that the address on Kazim Direk Caddesi belonged to a commercial building in a street which had no residential houses. However, there were at least two other streets of the same name in Izmir at that time, and the street might have been renamed. At any rate, the address could not be located. The pieces which Mellaart had described, never appeared in private collections or on the legal art market.

In 1962, the Turkish press began to accuse Mellaart of smuggling the treasure out of the country, in exchange for a cut worth 240 million Deutsche Marks. There was eye-witness testimony that a thick-set foreigner had been seen near the find location at Dorak with a woman; one witness even identified Mellaart himself. By 1964, public pressure had reached such a point that the Turkish government forbade Mellaart to excavate at Çatalhöyük; the following year, the government did allow him to enter Turkey, but on the condition that he would participate in excavation only as an assistant.

Debate about the Dorak Treasure
There are various views about the reality behind the Dorak affair. One perspective holds that Mellaart, who was known only in relation to the excavations at Çatalhöyük, had invented the treasure himself. The supposed letter from Anna Papastrati has similarities with the typewriter used by his wife in the institute and for his other correspondence at that time.

Another opinion connects the American accent of "Anna Papastrati" with the US base at Izmir or with employment at a CIA operation there. In the late 1960s, this was known as a key point for smuggling of items out of Turkey for the illegal art market. In this view, Mellaart was used to provide high-value finds of the Yortan culture with a history from a renowned expert. In this view, the meeting with Mellaart on the train was intentionally arranged and he was then played by criminals.

Posthumously, Mellaart has been implicated in several cases of fabrication of archeological finds.

References

Bibliography
 Kenneth Pearson/Patricia Connor, Die Dorak-Affäre. Schätze, Schmuggler, Journalisten. Zsolnay, Wien, Hamburg 1968.
 Dora Jane Hamblin, Türkei - Land der lebenden Legenden, Bastei-Lübbe, Bergisch Gladbach 1975, S. 187–197.

External links
 Suzan Mazur, Dorak Diggers Weigh in on Anna & Royal Treasure, www.scoop.co.nz from 4 August 2005
 Suzan Mazur, Getting to The Bottom of the Dorak Affair, www.scoop.co.nz from 27 August 2005 
 Suzan Mazur, The Dorak Affair's Final Chapter, www.scoop.co.nz from 10 October 2005 

Academic scandals
Scandals in Turkey
Archaeological discoveries in Turkey